Jorma Valter Ruissalo (January 30, 1912 – June 3, 2006) was a Finnish speed skater who competed in the 1936 Winter Olympics.

In 1936 he finished eighth in the 500 metres competition.

External links
 
 Speed skating 1936 

1912 births
2006 deaths
Finnish male speed skaters
Olympic speed skaters of Finland
Speed skaters at the 1936 Winter Olympics